Kypseli is situated in the eastern part of the Methana volcanic peninsula. It was originally a farming village. The older name of the village is Kosona. Kypseli community comprises also the village Agioi Theodoroi. The population of the village is 47 inhabitants, and the community population is 92 inhabitants according to 2011 census.

Historical population

References

Troizinia-Methana
Populated places in Islands (regional unit)